The Lust for Gold is a 1922 Australian silent film directed by Roy Darling.

Release
Despite starring several well-known actors, including Gilbert Emery of The Sentimental Bloke (1919), the film only received a limited release. Darling invested £400 of his own money to make the movie and lost it all, causing him to complain at the 1927 Royal Commission into the Australian Film Industry about unfair exhibition practices in Australia. Darling later made Daughter of the East (1924) with Dorothy Hawtree, star of this film.

Cast
Dorothy Hawtree
Gilbert Emery
Charles Villiers

References

External links

1922 films
Australian drama films
Australian silent films
Australian black-and-white films
1922 drama films
Silent drama films